Xiao Qian (born November 1964) is a Chinese diplomat who is the current Chinese ambassador to Australia, in office since January 2022. Previously he served as Chinese ambassador to Indonesia and before that, Chinese ambassador to Hungary.

Biography
Born in November 1964, Xiao joined the foreign service in 1986 and previously filled posts in Ethiopia, India, the United States, and the Philippines. In November 2012, he succeeded Gao Jian (diplomat) as Chinese ambassador to Hungary, serving in that position from 2012 to 2015. In 2015–17 he was director of the Asia Department of the Ministry of Foreign Affairs, in charge of Asia. He was designated by President Xi Jinping in December 2017 according to the decision of the National People's Congress, to replace Xie Feng as Chinese ambassador to Indonesia. In January 2022, he was appointed Chinese ambassador to Australia, succeeding .

Political view
On 9 August 2022 during the National Press Club of Australia event, Ambassador Xiao Qian claimed that the Taiwanese people might need "re-educating" in the event of any reunification with Mainland China. while responding to Australian reporters regarding similar comments from Chinese Ambassador to France.

Personal life 
Xiao is married and has a daughter.

Honours and awards 
 2015  Hungarian Order of Merit

References

1964 births
Living people
Ambassadors of China to Hungary
Ambassadors of China to Indonesia
Ambassadors of China to Australia
Diplomats of the People's Republic of China
Commander's Crosses of the Order of Merit of the Republic of Hungary (civil)